Melon's Not Dead is the fourth album from the J-pop group Melon Kinenbi released on February 17, 2010. It was their only original album after having graduated from Hello! Project. Most of the tracks are collaborations with various rock bands from the previous year. Its highest ranking on the Oricon weekly chart was #54, and it charted for two weeks.

Track listing

References

External links 
 Melon's Not Dead entry on the Up-Front Works official website

2010 albums
Melon Kinenbi albums
Zetima albums